Nordic combined at the 1994 Winter Olympics, consisted of two events, held from 18 February to 24 February. The ski jumping portion took place at Lysgårdsbakken, while the cross-country portion took place at Birkebeineren Ski Stadium.

Medal summary

Medal table

The Norwegians led the medal table, winning one of each type of medal.

Events

Participating NOCs

Sixteen nations participated in nordic combined at the Lillehammer Games. Belarus, the Czech Republic, Russia, Slovakia and Ukraine made their Olympic nordic combined debuts.

References

 
1994 Winter Olympics events
1994
1994 in Nordic combined
Nordic combined competitions in Norway
Men's events at the 1994 Winter Olympics